The King of Blaze, also known as Fire King ( or 'The King of Fire'), is a Taiwanese comic book series (called manhua in Taiwan) written and illustrated by the comic artist , serialized in Gong Juu Comics (Princess Comic Magazine) since 1991 and published in tankōbon format by  from 1992 to 1998. The series is the 2nd installment of The Seven Mirrors' Stories collection, and is considered to be one of Taiwan's first danmei comics.

Plot summary
The story takes place three years after the disappearance of the mausoleum of Li Ying, a fictional Tang dynasty imperial princess (see Melancholic Princess) who is the past life of Wei Yung-chien. Yung-chien meets Teles Connelly Downey, a Dutch-American entrepreneur and CEO based in New York City who is the reincarnation of Chung Tien, the god of fire (king of blaze), and they both share a familiar feeling with each other.

Yung-chien continues her search for the seven bronze mirrors that represent the seven gods, with the hope to find Shang Hsüan again. Meanwhile, Downey's memories of his past life in the Tang dynasty (7th century) begin to surface, in that life when he met his twin flame Ssŭ-tu Fêng-chien, an elegant and exquisite fortune teller who is the reincarnation of Chien Mei, the god of wind. Initially, Chung Tien didn't recognise that he has been one of the seven gods in their first past lives due to his cross-dressing and stunning feminine look.

Fêng-chien was wounded by the gold phoenix hairpin made by Chung Tien, as no one can survive being wounded by his metalwork... Will Chung Tien find him again no matter how many centuries pass? How does Downey fit into this never-ending wheel of fate?

Characters

Main characters

 Chung Tʻien
God of Fire, the King of Blaze with red hair, despite this, he has been known as a cold-hearted one among all the seven gods. His first reincarnation in the Tʻang dynasty is a red-haired and blue-eyed Caucasian blacksmith from the Western Regions, he meets his twin flame Ssŭ-tʻu Fêng-chien in this life. Teles (Terlirice) Connelly Downey is his second reincarnation in contemporary era, a Dutch-American CEO based in New York City. According to the author, the physical appearance of this character was inspired by the Dutch-Swedish model Marcus Schenkenberg.

 Chʻien Mei
God of Wind, a beautiful child with blond hair, he is blind, but can see the threads of fate. First time reincarnated as Ssŭ-tʻu Fêng-chien, a famous fortune teller in the Tʻang dynasty, cross-dressed himself as a young lady for keeping a secret that he no longer grew up since the age of 13. Reincarnated in contemporary era as an American teenage psychic named Shannon Arden. He is Chung Tien's soulmate.

 Wei Yung-chʻien
A 19-year-old Taiwanese-American girl living in New York City, who falls in love with Shang Hsüan. She is the reincarnation of the imperial princess Li Ying, a fictional character portrayed as the daughter of Emperor Kao-tsung and Empress Wu Tsê-tʻien, who, in turn is the reincarnation of Hua Chêng, the Goddess of Water.

Other characters

 You Hê
God of Lakes, Chung Tien's love rival. He is mortally wounded by Chung Tien during a fierce confrontation in Tang dynasty because of Chien Mei's reincarnation Ssŭ-tu Fêng-chien. He is the protagonist of the 3rd installment of The Seven Mirrors' Stories series — The Story of Tan Yü.

 Hao Yüeh
God of Thunder, reincarnated in the Tʻang dynasty as an imperial general and bodyguard of princess Li Ying, the two fall in love with each other.

 Shang Hsüan
God of Creation and Universe, the leader of the seven gods. He has a romantic relationship with Hua Chêng, the Goddess of Water.

 Ti Yün
God of Mountains, the only one that has healing ability apart from Shang Hsüan among the seven gods, and the most loyal one to Shang Hsüan.

 Flora Orr de Castel
A princess of a certain Central European principality (originally an Arab princess of English-Arab descent named Flora Whitall in the first edition), Teles Connelly Downey's fiancée. She is the incarnation of the Mirror of Water.

 Olive Contan
Teles Connelly Downey's secretary, has a crush on Teles, but Teles sees her as an elder sister. She was killed by Dore.

 Cygnus
Originally a reporter, later becomes Teles Connelly Downey's new secretary after the death of Olive Contan.

 Robert Fos
An American journalist and a close friend of Wei Yung-chien's father, who discovered the mausoleum of Li Ying in Melancholic Princess.

 Frederic Don
Known as the most expensive killer, works for Teles Connelly Downey.

 Chüeh Wên
Wei Yung-chʻien's childhood friend, he has a cheerful personality.

 Dore
Princess Flora's bodyguard, he made a promise that will kill anyone who hurts Flora.

List of volumes
 First edition

 New edition

Illustrated books

Two illustrated books by the same artist derived from The King of Blaze, which contain most of the pictures of the two main characters Chung Tien and Ssŭ-tu Fêng-chien (Chien Mei).

Yesterday Once More is the first picture collection illustrated book, published by Sharp Point Press in 1998. The first edition contains additional products: a collector's box, a large folio poster of Chien Mei and bookplate.
Hold Me to the Dream is the second picture collection illustrated book, published in Taiwan by Sharp Point Press in 1999, and in China by Xinjiang Juvenile Publishing House in 2001. A 40-page hardcover picture book with collector's box.

TV series adaptation
The King of Blaze is adapted into a television series of the same name by Mango TV, which aired on Hunan TV in 2018.

The series received generally negative responses from both critics and audience due to the huge differences between the manhua and its adaptation, and turning the BL (Boys' Love) manhua into a BG (Boy & Girl) drama. Douban gave it a 3.8 out of 10 rating, based on 5141 reviews, indicating "negative reviews". It has been questioned by the audience if the series is anything like the book except the names of some main characters. And the casting and special effects have been criticised for being inappropriate and horrible, respectively.

Reception 
The King of Blaze sold 70 thousand each tankōbon volume in Taiwan, and over 30 million collected tankōbon volumes of pirated edition in China, and reprinted 62 times. It was selected as the most popular manhua among Asian comics published in Taiwan (including Hong Kong manhua, Japanese manga, and Korean manhwa) by the Reader's Choice Vote held by the Taiwanese newspaper China Times, in 1997.

In The Application of Comics on General Education: A Study of the Body Implication in the Comics titled "Chingguo-Yuanling" and "Huo-Wang" by Su-Lan Yu, an article published in an academic journal of National Chung Hsing University, the author concludes after a detailed analysis:

Notes

References

External links 

Taiwanese comics titles
1991 comics debuts
Fantasy comics
Romance comics
Action-adventure comics
LGBT characters in comics
Yaoi anime and manga
Comics set in the Tang dynasty
Comics set in New York City
Manhua adapted into television series
Fiction about reincarnation
Supernatural fiction
Cross-dressing-related mass media
Fiction about interracial romance